DH Tauri, also known as DH Tau, is a type M star, located 140 parsecs (456.619 light years) away.

Characteristics
DH Tauri is a type M, or red dwarf star, one of the most common types of star in the Milky Way.

The spectral type has been classified as M7.5 or M9.25. The companion, while its host star still having a protoplanetary disk,  is still accreting material, being surrounded by a circumsubstellar disk (possibly a circumplanetary disk, depending on its formation history).

References

Tauri, DH
T Tauri stars
M-type main-sequence stars
J04294155+2632582
IRAS catalogue objects
Taurus (constellation)
Hypothetical planetary systems